Pragpur is a village in Kangra district of Himachal Pradesh. It is situated in the shadows of Dhauladhar range and was developed about three centuries ago.  Pragpur, along with the nearby village of Garli, is notified as a "Heritage Village" by a State Government notification dated 9 December 1997. As per the constitution of India and Panchyati Raaj Act, Pragpur village is administrated by the sarpanch, who is the elected representative of the village.

History  
Pragpur is said to have been founded in the late 16th century by the Patials. The area of Pragpur was part of the principality of Jaswan. 

Pragpur is an ornamental village with unchanged shops, cobblestone streets, old water tanks, mud-plastered walls and slate-roofed houses. The narrow streets, lined with fort-like houses, havelis and villas, are indicative of the area's aged charisma. Due to its unique architecture and pristine beauty, the state government of Himachal Pradesh declared Pragpur as the country's first Heritage Village in December 1997. 

The village is situated at the confluence of two 'khads' (seasonal water channel ) the Sehri khad and the Lag-Baliana khad which meet at Nakki. Hence it was called Pryagpur (pryag means the place where two water courses meet) which then became Pragpur. A 100-year old document in Sanskrit exists in which the principal of Oriental College, Lahore refers to the village as प्रयागपुर (Pryagpur). Since long the Lag-Baliana khad has been the source of water supply to Pragpur. Water mills also existed in Baliana.

According to available records the Post and Telegraph Department established the Pragpur post office on 18 February 1931.

Today the name Pragpur is unnecessarily being changed to Paragpur (परागपुर). The story of a princess, Parag Dei, after whom the village is supposed to have been named, lacks evidence as no one has come up even with the name of Parag Dei's father.

Along with Pragpur, the nearby village of Garli is a part of the Heritage Zone. The Judges Court is a resort built in a typical Anglo-Indian style of architecture. It stands in 12 acres of greens, and is just a short walk from the village core and the Taal.  Apart from the Judges Court, which was built in 1918, Mr Lal has restored his 300-year-old ancestral house.

Places of interest
 
The places of interest within the Heritage Village Pragpur are the Lala Rerumal Haveli built in 1931 by a Rais of Pragpur, which has a Mughal style garden, pleasure terrace and a large water reservoir. Butail Mandir, Chaujjar Mansion, courtyards of the Sood Clans, an ancient Shakti Mandir and atiyalas or public platforms are the pride of this heritage village. There are many silversmiths in the market selling traditional trinkets and curios. The village is known for its cottage industry. The inhabitants in the area are mostly craftspeople, weavers, basket makers, silversmiths, painters, musicians and tailors. One can purchase hand-woven blankets, shawls and hand-block printed clothes.

 Dehra: a small town near Pragpur
 Sidh Chaano Temple: a famous pilgrimage place in Pragpur
 Chhinmastika Dham: also known as Chintapurani Mata Mandir; a famous religious place; 27 km from Pragpur
 Jwalaji Mata: this temple is a famous religious place, 23 km from Pragpur
 Nearby markets: Garli, Dhalihara, Neharan Pukhar

Climate

 Spring: about mid-February to mid-April; the winter starts losing its bite around mid-February
 Summer: mid-April to end of June; it is hot in summer and light cottons are recommended
 Rainy season: July to September; still quite warm and humid; much rain
 Autumn: October to November; days are pleasantly warm; nights are cool; one may need light woollens at night or early mornings
 Winter: December-January; it is quite pleasant during the day and one may get by with one layer of woollens; the winter nights are cold and an extra layer of woolens is required.

Transport 
Pragpur is well connected by air, rail and road. Kangra Airport 

is the nearest airport, around 55 km away. Pathankot is another airport, about 100 km away.

By train, it is connected by the narrow gauge Kangra Railway, which starts at Pathankot.

The nearest rail hubs are Guler or Ranital, both about 20 km away.

By bus, it is 6 km from Kaloha on National Highway 70, connecting Amb to Hamirpur.

Pragpur is well connected with all the advanced communication networks. BSNL and all other network companies have their network here. Nationalize banks and India post have their branches here. Many local administrative offices also situated here.

References

Villages in Kangra district